During the 1994–95 English football season, Arsenal competed in the FA Premier League (known as the FA Carling Premiership for sponsorship reasons).

Season summary
Arsenal finished 12th in the Premier League, their lowest finish since 1976. Arsenal scored in only one of their first five League matches, fell immediately to mid-table mediocrity and stayed there throughout the whole season. Only six points stood between Arsenal and the relegation zone; they were 38 points behind the champions, Blackburn Rovers. Arsenal only scored 52, with Ian Wright collecting more than a third of those.

Arsenal hosted Queens Park Rangers on 31 December 1994. Danish midfielder John Jensen scored the goal for Arsenal in a 3-1 loss. It turned out to be his one and only goal for the club.

On 18 January 1995 Arsenal were knocked out in the FA Cup in a third round replay by London rivals Millwall. A week earlier Arsenal were also knocked out of the League Cup in the Quarter-final to eventual winners Liverpool, and (as Cup Winners’ Cup holders) also lost the Super Cup Final to AC Milan. In a press conference Paul Merson had admitted an alcohol, cocaine and gambling addiction, and was sent to rehab. Merson eventually made his comeback on the 1st of February 1995, against AC Milan in the Super Cup at Highbury, coming on as a substitute to an unbelievable reception from the Arsenal fans.

George Graham was sacked on 21 February 1995, and subsequently banned for a year from football by The FA after it was discovered he had accepted an illegal £425,000 payment from Norwegian agent Rune Hauge following Arsenal transfers John Jensen and Pål Lydersen in 1992, two of Hauge's clients. For in his final weeks in charge (in the days before transfer windows had been imposed), Graham bought three new signings - designed, he hoped, to reinvigorate his jaded squad. In came John Hartson, Chris Kiwomya and Dutchman Glenn Helder. Yet between them they made fewer than 100 starts for the club (21 goals) before being quietly offloaded by the club over the next two years.

Graham's assistant Stewart Houston took over as manager until the end of the season. His first match in charge was, in the evening 21 February 1995 the same day Graham was sacked, against Nottingham Forest at Highbury, in a 1-0 victory. Despite winning his first two games in charge, he always seemed to be a stop-gap. The changeover coincided with a run of 6 defeats in 7 games, leaving Arsenal in danger of being relegated just four years after winning the title and two years after their domestic cup double. However, the team rallied in the final weeks and took 8 points from their final 5 games, securing their Premier League spot. 

Arsenal reached the European Cup Winners' Cup final for the second year in succession. 

Bröndby and Omonia Nicosia were defeated in the opening rounds of the Cup Winners Cup, before a devastating left footed strike from Ian Wright eliminated French side Auxerre in the Quarter Final. 

A pendulous 3-2 win over Sampdoria at Highbury, in which Steve Bould netted twice, set Houston`s team up for a nervy second leg at Stadio Luigi Ferraris. Roberto Mancini put Sampdoria ahead, before Ian Wright headed home an equaliser. Claudio Bellucci appeared to have broken Arsenal hearts with goals in the 84th and 87th minutes, but Stefan Schwarz`s last gasp free kick took the tie to extra time. David Seaman, playing with three broken ribs, was the hero saving three penalties in the shootout, Seaman denied Mihajlović, Jugović and Lombardo's kicks as the Gunners scraped through. 

In Paris at Parc des Princes Real Zaragoza won the final, after former Tottenham Hotspur-player Nayim lobbed Seaman from over 40 yards, in the last seconds of extra time.

Final league table

Results summary

Results by round

Squad

Left club during season

Squad statistics

Results

Premier League

Matches

UEFA Cup Winners' Cup

First round

Second round

Quarter-finals

Semi-finals

Final

European Super Cup

FA Cup

League Cup

References

Arsenal F.C. seasons
Arsenal